Acute decompensated heart failure (ADHF) is a sudden worsening of the signs and symptoms of heart failure, which typically includes difficulty breathing (dyspnea), leg or feet swelling, and fatigue. ADHF is a common and potentially serious cause of acute respiratory distress. The condition is caused by severe congestion of multiple organs by fluid that is inadequately circulated by the failing heart. An attack of decompensation can be caused by underlying medical illness, such as myocardial infarction, an abnormal heart rhythm, infection, or thyroid disease.

Treatment consists of reducing the fluid level with diuretics and improving heart function with nitrates, or levosimendan; other treatments such as aquapheresis ultra-filtration may also be required.

Signs and symptoms

Difficulty breathing, a cardinal symptom of left ventricular failure, may manifest with progressively increasing severity as the following:
 Difficulty breathing with physical activity (exertional dyspnea)
 Difficulty breathing while lying flat (orthopnea)
 Episodes of waking up from sleep gasping for air (paroxysmal nocturnal dyspnea)
 Acute pulmonary edema

Other cardiac symptoms of heart failure include chest pain/pressure and palpitations. Common noncardiac signs and symptoms of heart failure include loss of appetite, nausea, weight loss, bloating, fatigue, weakness, low urine output, waking up at night to urinate, and cerebral symptoms of varying severity, ranging from anxiety to memory impairment and confusion.

Causes
Chronic stable heart failure may easily decompensate. This most commonly results from an intercurrent illness (such as pneumonia), myocardial infarction (a heart attack), abnormal heart rhythms (such as atrial fibrillation), uncontrolled high blood pressure, or the person's failure to maintain a fluid restriction, diet, or medication.  Other well recognized precipitating factors include anemia and hyperthyroidism which place additional strain on the heart muscle. Excessive fluid or salt intake, and medication that causes fluid retention such as NSAIDs and thiazolidinediones, may also precipitate decompensation.

Acute myocardial infarction can precipitate acute decompensated heart failure and will necessitate emergent revascularization with thrombolytics, percutaneous coronary intervention, or coronary artery bypass graft.

Diagnosis

A jugular venous distension is the most sensitive clinical sign for acute decompensation.

Treatment
In acute decompensated heart failure, the immediate goal is to re-establish adequate perfusion and oxygen delivery to end organs. This entails ensuring that airway, breathing, and circulation are adequate. Management consists of propping up the head of the patient, giving oxygen to correct hypoxemia, administering morphine, diuretics like furosemide, addition of an ACE inhibitor, use of nitrates and use of digoxin if indicated for the heart failure and if arrhythmic.

Oxygen
Supplemental oxygen may be administered if blood levels of oxygen are low; the Heart Failure Society of America, however, has recommended that it not be used routinely.

Medication

Initial therapy of acute decompensated heart failure usually includes some combination of a vasodilator such as nitroglycerin, a loop diuretic such as furosemide, and non-invasive positive pressure ventilation (NIPPV).

Even if symptoms of heart failure are not present, medications can be used to treat the symptoms that are being experienced. These medicines work to control these symptoms as well as treat other health problems that might be present. They can work to improve the quality of life, slow down the progression of heart failure and reduce the risk for other complications that can occur due to heart failure. It is very important to take proper medicines exactly as prescribed by the physician.

A number of different medications are required for people who are experiencing heart failure. Common types of medications that are prescribed for heart failure patients include ACE inhibitors, vasodilators, beta blockers, aspirin, calcium channel blockers, and cholesterol lowering medications such as statins. Depending on the type of damage a patient has suffered and the underlying cause of the heart failure, any of these drug classes or a combination of them can be prescribed. Patients with heart pumping problems will use a different medication combination than those who are experiencing problems with the heart's ability to fill properly during diastole. Potentially dangerous drug interactions can occur when different drugs mix together and work against each other.

Vasodilators

Nitrates such as nitroglycerin are often used as part of the initial therapy for ADHF.

Another option is nesiritide, although it should only be considered if conventional therapy has been ineffective or contraindicated as it is much more expensive than nitroglycerine and has not been shown to be of any greater benefit.

Diuretics
Heart failure is usually associated with a volume overloaded state.  Therefore, those with evidence of fluid overload should be treated initially with intravenous loop diuretics.  In the absence of symptomatic low blood pressure intravenous nitroglycerin is often used in addition to diuretic therapy to improve congestive symptoms.

Volume status should still be adequately evaluated. Some heart failure patients on chronic diuretics can undergo excessive diuresis. In the case of diastolic dysfunction without systolic dysfunction, fluid resuscitation may, in fact, improve circulation by decreasing heart rate, which will allow the ventricles more time to fill. Even if the patient is edematous, fluid resuscitation may be the first line of treatment if the person's blood pressure is low. The person may, in fact, have too little fluid in their blood vessels, but if the low blood pressure is due to cardiogenic shock, the administration of additional fluid may worsen the heart failure and associated low blood pressure. If the person's circulatory volume is adequate but there is persistent evidence of inadequate end-organ perfusion, inotropes may be administered. In certain circumstances, a left ventricular assist device (LVAD) may be necessary.

Once the person is stabilized, attention can be turned to treating pulmonary edema to improve oxygenation. Intravenous furosemide is generally the first line. However, people on long-standing diuretic regimens can become tolerant, and dosages must be progressively increased. If high doses of furosemide are inadequate, boluses or continuous infusions of bumetanide may be preferred. These loop diuretics may be combined with thiazide diuretics such as oral metolazone or intravenous chlorothiazide for a synergistic effect. Intravenous preparations are physiologically preferred because of more predictable absorption due to intestinal edema, however, oral preparations can be significantly more cost effective.

Others

ACE inhibitors and ARBs
The effectiveness and safety of ACE inhibitors and angiotensin receptor blockers (ARBs) acutely in ADHF have not been well studied, but are potentially harmful.  A person should be stabilized before therapy with either of these medication classes is initiated. Individuals with poor kidney perfusion are especially at risk for kidney impairment inherent with these medications.

Beta-blockers
Beta-blockers are stopped or decreased in people with acutely decompensated heart failure and a low blood pressure. However, continuation of beta-blockers may be appropriate if the blood pressure is adequate.

Inotropic agents
Inotropes are indicated if low blood pressure ( SBP < 90 mmHg ) is present.

Opioids
Opioids have traditionally been used in the treatment of the acute pulmonary edema that results from acute decompensated heart failure.  A 2006 review, however, found little evidence to support this practice.

Ventilation

Continuous positive airway pressure may be applied using a face mask; this has been shown to improve symptoms more quickly than oxygen therapy alone, and has been shown to reduce the risk of death. Severe respiratory failure requires treatment with endotracheal intubation and mechanical ventilation.

Ultrafiltration 

Ultrafiltration can be used to remove fluids in people with ADHF associated with kidney failure. Studies have found that it decreases health care utilization at 90 days.

Surgery

Certain scenarios will require emergent consultation with cardiothoracic surgery. Heart failure due to acute aortic regurgitation is a surgical emergency associated with high mortality. Heart failure may occur after rupture of ventricular aneurysm. These can form after myocardial infarction. If it ruptures on the free wall, it will cause cardiac tamponade. If it ruptures on the intraventricular septum, it can create a  ventricular septal defect. Other causes of cardiac tamponade may also require surgical intervention, although emergent treatment at the bedside may be adequate. It should also be determined whether the patient had a history of a repaired congenital heart disease as they often have complex cardiac anatomy with artificial grafts and shunts that may sustain damage, leading to acute decompensated heart failure.

In some cases, doctors recommend surgery to treat the underlying problem that led to heart failure. Different procedures are available depending on the level of necessity and include coronary artery bypass surgery, heart valve repair or replacement, or heart transplantation. During these procedures, devices such as heart pumps, pacemakers, or defibrillators might be implanted. The treatment of heart disease is rapidly changing and thus new therapies for acute heart failure treatment are being introduced to save more lives from these massive attacks.

Bypass surgery is performed by removing a vein from the arm or leg, or an artery from the chest and replacing the blocked artery in the heart. This allows the blood to flow more freely through the heart. Valve repair is where the valve that is causing heart failure is modified by removing excess valve tissues that cause them to close too tightly. In some cases, annuloplasty is required to replace the ring around the valves. If the repair of the valve is not possible, it is replaced by an artificial heart valve. The final step is heart replacement. When severe heart failure is present and medicines or other heart procedures are not effective, the diseased heart needs to be replaced.

Another common procedure used to treat heart failure patients is an angioplasty. Is a procedure used to improve the symptoms of coronary artery disease (CAD), reduce the damage to the heart muscle after a heart attack, and reduce the risk of death in some patients. This procedure is performed by placing a balloon in the heart to open an artery that is blocked by atherosclerosis or a buildup of plaque on the artery walls. People who are experiencing heart failure because of CAD or recent heart attack can benefit from this procedure.

A pacemaker is a small device that's placed in the chest or abdomen to help control abnormal heart rhythms.  They work by sending electric pulses to the heart to prompt it to beat at a rate that is considered to be normal and are used to treat patients with arrhythmias. They can be used to treat hearts that are classified as either a tachycardia that beats too fast, or a bradycardia that beats too slow.

See also
CXL 1020

References

External links 

Heart diseases
Organ failure